Campbell Newman was elected Leader of the Liberal National Party of Queensland on 2 April 2011. Because he was not a Member of Parliament, he cannot be Leader of the Opposition. As a result, Jeff Seeney was chosen as the party's parliamentary leader and serves as Opposition Leader. On 11 April 2011, Newman announced his Shadow Cabinet.

Shadow Ministry list
On 11 April 2011, Campbell Newman announced the following Shadow Ministry appointments:

See also
 Opposition (Queensland)
 Bligh Ministry
 Newman Ministry

References

External links
 Office of the Queensland Opposition

Politics of Queensland